The 168th New York State Legislature, consisting of the New York State Senate and the New York State Assembly, met from January 3, 1951, to March 20, 1952, during the ninth and tenth years of Thomas E. Dewey's governorship, in Albany.

Background
Under the provisions of the New York Constitution of 1938, re-apportioned in 1943, 56 Senators and 150 assemblymen were elected in single-seat districts for two-year terms. The senatorial districts consisted either of one or more entire counties; or a contiguous area within a single county. The counties which were divided into more than one senatorial district were Kings (nine districts), New York (six), Bronx (five), Queens (four), Erie (three), Westchester (three), Monroe (two) and Nassau (two). The Assembly districts consisted either of a single entire county (except Hamilton Co.), or of contiguous area within one county.

At this time there were two major political parties: the Republican Party and the Democratic Party. The Liberal Party, the American Labor Party, the Socialist Workers Party, and the Socialist Labor Party (running under the name of "Industrial Government Party") also nominated tickets.

Elections
The New York state election, 1950, was held on November 7. Governor Thomas E. Dewey (Rep.) was re-elected. New York State Comptroller Frank C. Moore (Rep.) was elected lieutenant governor. Of the other three statewide elective offices up for election, two were carried by the Republicans. The Democratic/Liberal incumbent U.S. Senator Herbert H. Lehman defeated his Republican challenger lieutenant governor Joe R. Hanley. The approximate party strength at this election, as expressed by the vote for governor, was: Republicans 2,820,000; Democrats 1,981,000; Liberals 266,000; American Labor 222,000; Socialist Workers 13,000; and Industrial Government 7,000.

Five of the seven women members of the previous legislature—Assemblywomen Mary A. Gillen (Dem.), of Brooklyn; Janet Hill Gordon (Rep.), a lawyer of Norwich; Genesta M. Strong (Rep.), of Plandome Heights; Mildred F. Taylor (Rep.), a coal dealer of Lyons; and Maude E. Ten Eyck (Rep.), of Manhattan—were re-elected.

The New York state election, 1951, was held on November 6. No statewide elective offices were up for election. Four vacancies in the Assembly were filled.

Sessions
The Legislature met for the first regular session (the 174th) at the State Capitol in Albany on January 3, 1951; and adjourned on March 16.

Oswald D. Heck (Rep.) was re-elected Speaker.

Arthur H. Wicks (Rep.) was re-elected Temporary President of the State Senate.

The Legislature met for a special session at the State Capitol in Albany on December 6, 1951, to enact the re-apportionment of congressional seats according to the 1950 U.S. census.

The Legislature met for the second regular session (the 175th) at the State Capitol in Albany on January 9, 1952; and adjourned on March 20.

State Senate

Districts

Senators
The asterisk (*) denotes members of the previous Legislature who continued in office as members of this Legislature. Frank S. McCullough changed from the Assembly to the Senate at the beginning of this Legislature. Assemblyman Orlo M. Brees was elected to fill a vacancy in the Senate.

Note: For brevity, the chairmanships omit the words "...the Committee on (the)..."

Employees
 Secretary: William S. King

State Assembly

Assemblymen

Note: For brevity, the chairmanships omit the words "...the Committee on (the)..."

Employees
 Clerk: Ansley B. Borkowski
 Sergeant-at-Arms: Herbert A. Bartholomew

Notes

Sources
 Members of the New York Senate (1950s) at Political Graveyard
 Members of the New York Assembly (1950s) at Political Graveyard

168
1951 in New York (state)
1952 in New York (state)
1951 U.S. legislative sessions
1952 U.S. legislative sessions